Jyothi High School is a Kannada Medium high school in Ajekar, Karnataka, India, administered by the Society of the Sisters of Bethany
and managed by Government of Karnataka (Aided) established in the year 1964.

References

Schools in Karnataka